Unal a village in Boudh district, Odisha, a state in India.

Population
The population was 434 at the 2008 census. According to the 2008 census, there are 91 households. There are 215 men and 219 women in the village.

References

Villages in Boudh district